Ahoy or Ahoj may refer to:

 Ahoy (greeting)
 Rotterdam Ahoy, an indoor sports arena in Rotterdam, Netherlands
 Australian Humanist of the Year, an award
Chips Ahoy!, a brand of cookie

Literature 

 Ahoy!, a magazine
 Ahoy Comics, American comic book publisher

See also
 Ahoi Ashtami
 Ahoj, an area in Nové Mesto, Bratislava